The handball events at the 1991 All-Africa Games were held in Cairo, Egypt from 24 to 30 September 1991. The competition included the men's tournament for the fifth time and the women's tournament for third time.

Events

Men's tournament 

Final standing is:

Women's tournament 

Final standing is:

References

 
Handball at the African Games
All-Africa Games
1991 in African handball